Kfar Nabrakh ( Kfar Nabrakh) is a municipality in the Chouf District of Mount Lebanon Governorate, Lebanon. It is located 50 kilometers southeast of Beirut. Kfarnabrakh total land area consists of 941 hectares. Its average elevation is 1,010 meters above sea level. Its inhabitants are religiously mixed, with a Druze majority and a Melkite Christian minority. During the Lebanese Civil War, 64 residents of the village were killed in the violence.

References

Populated places in Chouf District
Melkite Christian communities in Lebanon
Druze communities in Lebanon